Vasiliy Grabin (1900–1980) was a Soviet artillery designer.

Grabin may also refer to the following villages in Poland:
Grabin, Lubusz Voivodeship (west Poland)
Grabin, Opole Voivodeship (south-west Poland)
Grabin, Pomeranian Voivodeship (north Poland)
Grabin, Warmian-Masurian Voivodeship (north Poland)
Grabin, West Pomeranian Voivodeship (north-west Poland)

See also
 Graben